Kaipara District Council is the territorial authority for the Kaipara District of New Zealand.

The council is led by the mayor of Kaipara, who is currently . There are also eight ward councillors.

References

External links
 Official website

Kaipara District
Politics of the Northland Region
Territorial authorities of New Zealand